Alex Lissitsa (born 23 April 1974) is a Ukrainian public figure, a leading specialist in agribusiness and food industry sectors of the economy and president of the Ukrainian Agribusiness Club.

Education 
Lissitsa was born in a village Telne,  Koryukiv district, Chernihiv Oblast. Lissitsa holds a Master's degree in enterprise economics from the National University of Life and Environmental Sciences of Ukraine and a Ph.D. in Agricultural Economics from Humboldt University of Berlin. He has done post-doctoral research at the School of Economics, University of Queensland (Brisbane, Australia) and Iowa State University.

Career 
While studying at Humboldt University, Lissitsa worked as a research assistant. After graduation he was invited to work as a leading researcher at the Institute of Agrarian Development of Central and Eastern Europe in Halle, Germany.

In 2006–2007, he held the position of General Director of the Ukrainian Agrarian Confederation Association.

In 2007 he founded and headed the Ukrainian Agribusiness Club.

In 2009–2011 he held the position of non-executive director of Agroton group, one of the largest agricultural producers in Ukraine.

Alex Lissitsa was an adviser to the Minister of Agrarian Policy of Ukraine Yuriy Melnyk and the Committee on Agrarian Policy and Land Relations of the Verkhovna Rada of Ukraine.

In 2012, held the position of non-executive director of the Industrial Dairy Company (IMC).

Since May 2013, he has held the position of General Director of the Industrial Dairy Company (IMC).

Lissitsa is the Chairman of the Board of the Ukrainian Center for European Policy.

Lissitsa has been the Chairman of the Council for Agrarian Education at the Ministry of Education and Science of Ukraine since 2017.

He has been a member of the Board of Directors of the Ukrainian Corporate Governance Academy since 2017.

Since 2019, he has been the founder and actively developing the program of multi-discipline specialist training "Agrokebety" on the basis of the Faculty of Agrarian Management of National University of Life and Environmental Sciences of Ukraine, which allows to obtain a state-recognized degree.

Candidate for People's Deputies of the party "Ukrainian Strategy of Groysman" in the early parliamentary elections to the Verkhovna Rada of Ukraine on 21 July 2019, No. 15 on the list. Non-partisan.

On 18 December 2020 he was elected co-chair of the Eastern European Committee DLG (Germany)

In June 2021, he became an ambassador of the economic direction of the UN General Assembly in Ukraine.

Together with former Cabinet Minister Dmytro Dubilet he created an online land sale platform dobrozem.com.ua

Education 
In 2000, Alex Lissitsa won the grand prize at one of the prestigious competitions of the Konrad Adenauer Foundation.

Alex Lissitsa is the best top manager in the agricultural industry according to Landlord magazine.

Winner of 2020 Agro Champions Award in nomination Mentor of the Year

Publications 
Lisitsa is the author of 40 scientific publications in Ukrainian, German, English and Russian.

Some of the publications:

 Lissitsa, Alexej & Rungsuriyawiboon, Supawat, 2006. Agricultural productivity growth in the European Union and transition countries (eng.)
 Lissitsa, Alexej & Odening, Martin, 2001. Effizienz und totale Faktorproduktivität in der ukrainischen Landwirtschaft im Transformationsprozess (deu.)
 Лисситса, Алексей 2006. Единая аграрная политика Европейского Союза: путь становления и принципы функционирования (rus.)

The author of a textbook for students "50 questions and answers about agriculture".

References

21st-century Ukrainian economists
Agricultural economists
Humboldt University of Berlin alumni
National University of Life and Environmental Sciences of Ukraine alumni
People from Chernihiv Oblast
1974 births
Living people